The Colle dei Signori (in Italian) or Col des Seigneurs (in French) at 2,107 m is a mountain pass in the Ligurian Alps. It connects the valleys of Roya in France and Tanaro in Italy.

Geography 

The Colle dei Signori is located on the main chain of the Alps between the Cime de Capoves and Cima di Gaina. It connects the basins of the Ligurian Sea (West of the pass) and the River Po. Administratively is located between Italian municipality of Briga Alta and one exclave of the French municipality of La Brigue.

History 
The pass up to World War II was totally in Italian territory but, following the Paris Peace Treaties, signed in February 1947, is now on the border between Italy and France.

Cycling 
The pass is easily accessible with a mountain bike by following the old military road.

See also

 List of mountain passes
 France–Italy border

References

Mountain passes of Piedmont
Mountain passes of Provence-Alpes-Côte d'Azur
Mountain passes of the Ligurian Alps
France–Italy border crossings